Estadio Correcaminos is a multi-use stadium in San Francisco Gotera, El Salvador.  
It is currently used mostly for football matches and is the home stadium of Fuerte San Francisco.

It is named after the team's nickname. The cost of its construction was US$510,000. The stadium holds 12,000 people.

External links
 Estreno sin hermosura at Laprensagrafica.com.
 Estreno correcamino at DiarioCoLatino.com

Football venues in El Salvador